Cheating in esports is a deliberate violation of the rules of an esports governing body or other behavior that is intended to give an unfair advantage to a player or team. At its core, esports are video game competitions in an organized, competitive environment. Tournaments often pay out prize money to the highest placing teams in these events, giving players an incentive to cheat. Commonly cited instances of cheating include the use of software cheats, such as aimbots and wallhacks, exploitation of bugs, use of performance-enhancing drugs, such as Ritalin and Adderall, and match fixing.

Regulation in esports is not as unified as other traditional sports. Since esports is not considered a sport in many countries, many state and national regulations may not apply to them. Moreover, video game developers and individual tournament organizers may choose to have a different set of regulations. While several global governing bodies have attempted to regulate the esports space, such as the Esports Integrity Commission, they have largely been unsuccessful.

Background 

Esports are individuals teams playing organized, competitive video games at a professional level. Similar to traditional sports, professional esports players are often contracted by esports organizations to compete in leagues and tournaments. There is a wide variety of video game genres associated with esports, such as first-person shooters, multiplayer online battle arenas (MOBAs), and sports video games. Some esports events pull in millions of viewers, and while fans can watch esports events through broadcasts on platforms such as Twitch and ESPN, some events can be attended live at arenas. Prize money is often paid to the top-placing teams at these tournaments. With the possibility of financial gain, players have an incentive to cheat.

Esports specific regulation 
Unlike traditional major league sports, such as association football's FIFA and American football's NFL, esports is not centralized under a single organization. While these traditional sports leagues are self-regulated and governed by relevant statutes, case law, and national or state regulations, esports is largely unregulated. In many countries, esports is not recognized as a sport, and therefore, general regulation becomes difficult. For any video game title, tournament organizers generally provide their own set of rules, subject to the video game's developers.

There are two types of entities that regulate esports competitions: game-neutral entities and game-specific entities. Game-neutral entities, such as the World Esports Association (WESA), the Esports Integrity Commission (ESIC), the International Esports Federation (IESF), and the Electronic Sports League (ESL), are entities that enforce policies over a variety of esports titles. While these bodies have attempted to regulate the esports industry, they have largely been unsuccessful. As of 2019, ESIC is the leading regulatory body on enforcing ethics in esports; however, it is not universally adopted, as leagues do not have to be a part of ESIC. In order of magnitude, they consider software cheats, online attacks, match fixing, and doping as the most significant forms of cheating. Game-specific entities are entities that enforce policies over a single esports title and are usually controlled by that game's publisher. Examples include the Overwatch League, the League of Legends Championship Series, and the Call of Duty League.

Types of cheating 
Cheating in esports is divided into two categories: cheating to win and cheating to lose. Cheating to win is the attempt to secure a win over an opposing player or team through illegitimate means. Common forms of this type of cheating are using software cheats, online attacks, and doping. On the other hand, cheating to lose is the concept of intentionally underperforming or losing a match, usually for financial gain. This can be done in several ways, such as match fixing, corrupting officials and technicians, spot-fixing, and manipulating tournament structures.

Cheating to win

Software cheats 

Esports players can gain an advantage by using unauthorized software, such as an aimbot — software that automatically targets opponents faster and more accurately than most humans can. Most esports servers have built-in anti-cheat software that attempt to prevent cheating.

An example of a player using software assistance is Counter-Strike: Global Offensive (CS:GO) player XektoR, who performed extremely well during German ESL Pro Series online matches; however, during in-person events, his performance fell off significantly. Members of the ESL reviewed analytics from his replay data to determine that he was using an aimbot and wallhacks during the online matches, and he was banned for two years. His team took ESL to the District Court of Cologne, and while the court did not make a statement on whether XektoR cheated or not, they did determine that the measures ESL took were appropriate.

Software cheats are not exclusive to online play, however. On October 19, 2018, CS:GO player Nikhil "forsaken" Kumawat was caught using an aimbot at the Extremesland Zowie Asia CS:GO 2018 tournament in Shanghai. When a tournament administrator began to examine Kumawat's computer, Kumawat apparently attempted to brush aside the administrator and delete the hack. Following, his team, OpTic India, was disqualified from the event and disbanded altogether. ESIC required ESL India to provide conclusive evidence of cheating, and after ESL reviewed Kumawat's play from a previous tournament, the India Premiership Fall Finals, they determined had he had cheated in both events. ESIC banned Kumawat for five years.

Hardware cheats 
Generally, tournament organizers will restrict the type of hardware that players are allowed to use. Many tournaments allow players to bring their own mouse and keyboard to an event, allowing the possibility of a player using an unauthorized piece of equipment. For example, Peruvian Dota 2 team Thunder Predator was disqualified from The International 2018 after it was revealed that Atún, one of their players, programmed macro commands into his mouse in a qualifying match on June 19, 2018.  FACEIT, the tournament organizer, deemed that the use of a programmable mouse was equivalent to running a software script. Hardware cheats are not restricted to mice and keyboards, however. In 2018, CS:GO player Ra1f was caught using a hardware cheat that involved plugging in a second computer into his main computer. The cheat allowed him to bypass ESEA anti-cheat technology and reveal the positions of all of his opponents.

Bug exploitation 
With most video games, software bugs are inevitable, and individuals or teams may exploit these bugs to gain an unfair advantages over their opponents. Most esports integrity policies prohibit the intentional exploitation of bugs, while the unintentional use of a bug may be permitted.

CS:GO has seen several instances of intentional bug abuse. At DreamHack Winter 2014, team Fnatic exploited bugs that allowed them to stand on invisible ledges, see through solid objects, and become invulnerable to damage. The latter two bugs were directly against the tournament organizer's rules, and Fnatic was forced to replay the match; however, Fnatic decided to forfeit instead. At the PGL Major: Kraków 2017, team BIG exploited a bug that allowed them to peek their heads over a wall without having their heads displayed on the other side and ultimately won the match. BIG was not penalized by the tournament organizers, leading to controversy over whether or not the exploit was unsportsmanlike. Following the match, the remaining teams in the tournament agreed to a gentleman's agreement to not use the bug exploit in future matches.

While bug exploits are usually performed by players, one of the largest bug abuse scandals in esports is the Counter-Strike coaching bug scandal. In August 2020, ESL banned three coaches that had abused a bug that allowed them to see parts of the map that they would not normally be able to see. After their own investigation, ESIC sanctioned 37 coaches in September, with bans ranging from a period of five- to 36-months. After further investigation, nearly 100 new sanctions were issued by ESIC in May 2022.

Doping 
Similar to doping in traditional sports, the use of performance-enhancing drugs (PEDs), particularly nootropics such as Ritalin and Adderall, has been an issue in esports. Several countries have regulations restricting the use of PEDs. The United States Anti-Doping Agency (USADA) has a list of such restricted substances in compliance with the World Anti-Doping Code (WADA), which includes Ritalin, but not Adderall, as of 2019. India's National Anti-Doping Agency (NADA) has the same restricted list as WADA. However, it is unclear if either the USADA or NADA regulations are applicable to esports athletes.

In 2015, professional CS:GO player Kory "Semphis" Friesen acknowledged that the use of Adderall in the CS:GO scene was so commonplace that nearly all players were using the drug. In response to the statement, the Electronic Sports League (ESL) implemented anti-doping policies, akin to those in cycling and the Olympics, by August 2015. There are doubts on whether or not these regulations are effective, as if they are used by a player, the drugs would not stay in their system for very long. In 2016, no players were reported by the ESL to have been using any PEDs. In 2020, the Washington Post interviewed several esports players who claimed that the use of Adderall had been "an open secret in the esports community for years." However, many leagues neither test nor prohibit the use of such drugs.

Ghosting 

Ghosting refers to a player or team acquiring additional information during a match from third-party sources, such as stream viewers or the live audience. An example of ghosting during a live match occurred in a match between Azubu Frost and Team SoloMid at the 2012 League of Legends World Championship. In the middle of their match, one of Frost's players appeared to turn his head and look at the spectator screens, allowing him to see the positions of his opponents. Riot Games ruled that the outcome of the match would be upheld, as they stated that the incident did not affect the outcome of the match, and issued a $30,000 fine to Azubu Frost. Additionally, Riot looked at four other instances of screen watching during the World Championship and determined that none of them affected the outcome of any matches. Another instance of screen watching occurred at the 2019 Fortnite World Cup Finals. During the match, Mark "Letw1k3" Danilov appeared to look at the spectator screen, which was strictly prohibited by the World Cup rules. Danilov received multiple warnings before being removed from the match.

Online attacks 
While some esports events take place live at stadiums with an audience, most qualifiers for knockout stages of esports competitions are held online. Generally, two teams will compete against each other through an official server, and online attacks, also known as distributed denial of service (DDoS), are somewhat common in these types of matches. The attack occurs when the internet connection of a player is tampered with by directing large amounts of traffic towards them, causing the player to lag to the point that the game is unplayable. One notable instance of a DDoS attack in esports occurred during a League of Legends European Challenger Series match between Denial Esports and Dignitas in 2015. One of Denial's players experienced a DDoS attack during a match, forcing the team to pause the match. The player attempted to play at several different locations afterwards but was subsequently DDoS'd each time. Denial was forced to forfeit the match after they surpassed the ten minutes allotted to pause a match.

Cheating to lose

Match fixing 
Match fixing in esports is identical to that of match fixing in traditional sports. It occurs when a team intentionally underperforms or loses a match in order to profit, usually by means of betting fraud. Generally, match fixing is done in conjunction with gambling and betting markets. In the United States, there are several laws and statues that provide criminal penalties for bribery, gambling, and match fixing in traditional sports, such as the Wire Act of 1961 and Sports Bribery Act of 1964. However, it is unclear as to whether these acts apply to esports, as many do not consider esports as a sport in the traditional sense.

The first mainstream instance of match fixing occurred in 2010, when the Korea e-Sports Association (KeSPA), an organization that managed esports in South Korea, fined and permanently banned 11 StarCraft players after they found them guilty of match fixing. On top of these punishments, some of the players also received jail time. Another StarCraft match-fixing scandal broke in 2016, when StarCraft II World Champion Lee "Life" Seung-hyun accepted  (~$62,000) to intentionally lose two matches in May 2015. He received a lifetime ban from KeSPA and was imprisoned. Arguably, the largest match fixing scandal in esports occurred when South Korean investigators announced in October 2015 that they had arrested 12 people, including three players, who were involved in five fixed StarCraft 2 matches.

One of the most prominent instances of esports match-fixing was the Counter-Strike match fixing scandal that came to light in 2015 involving the two teams iBUYPOWER and NetCodeGuides. It was revealed that in an August 2014 match between the two teams, iBUYPOWER intentionally lost; seven players were banned from all future Valve-sponsored events.

Spot fixing 
Spot fixing is similar to match fixing, but as opposed to fixing an entire match, a player or team will fix a particular part of a match, usually in conjunction with a proposition bet. In May 2022, such allegations came forward against CS:GO team PARTY in regards to a 2015 match at the StarLadder Regional Minor Championship CIS closed qualifier.

Structural tournament manipulation 
Structural tournament manipulation is the concept of deliberately underperforming in order to take advantage of a tournament structure. This form of cheating is rare, and only one notable occurrence of such an event happened during the Counter-Strike match fixing scandal in 2014 between teams iBUYPOWER and NetCodeGuides.

See also 
Cheating in video games
Cheating in online games

References